Shankar Guru is a 1978 Indian Kannada-language action thriller film directed by V. Somashekhar, written by Chi. Udayashankar and produced by Parvathamma Rajkumar under the banner of Dakshayini Combines. It stars Rajkumar in the lead role alongside Jayamala, Padmapriya, Kanchana, Balakrishna, Vajramuni, Thoogudeepa Srinivas and Uma Shivakumar in supporting roles. Rajkumar appears in a triple role in the film — as a father and his two sons separated in childhood.

The film was Parvathamma Rajkumar's first outing as a producer for a mainstream production. She produced the film under the banner of Dakshayini Combines. The film was shot extensively in and around Kashmir. The film features original songs that was composed by Upendra Kumar, while the lyrics were written by Chi. Udaya Shankar. The cinematography of the film was done by R. Madhusudan, while the editing was done by P. Bhaktavatsalam. This was the second film of Rajkumar after Kula Gourava in which he played a triple role and his only colour movie in triple role.

The film was released on 17 February 1978 to widespread critical acclaim and was declared an all-time blockbuster at the box office. The film had a theatrical run of over a year. It grossed 3.26 crores in its final run becoming the first Kannada film to gross over 3 crores at the box office breaking record of the 1972 film Bangaarada Manushya making this film the highest grossing Kannada film of the 70's. P. Bhaktavatsalam won the Karnataka State Film Award for Best Editor for his work in the film. The movie was remade in Telugu in 1978 as Kumara Raja, in Tamil in 1979 as Thirisoolam and in Hindi in 1983 as Mahaan.

Plot
Rajashekhar is an upright businessman whose associates are involved in shady deals. During an argument over such a deal, a scuffle ensues and Rajashekhar accidentally shoots one of his associates dead. Fleeing from the police, he loses contact with his pregnant wife Sumathi.

Many years later, Sumathi is now living with her son Shankar in Delhi, while Rajashekhar is a rich estate owner in Kashmir. Rajashekhar's niece Nalini encounters Shankar in Delhi and recommends him to manage her uncle's estate in Kashmir. Also arriving in Kashmir for a romantic quest with a rich girl Malathi is Guru - Shankar's lookalike. Through Shankar, Rajashekhar finally manages to establish contact with his long-lost wife Sumathi and is overwhelmed with joy.

However, before he can meet Sumathi, trouble arrives in the form of Rajashekhar's erstwhile crooked business partners, who are after a valuable necklace stolen from a temple in Delhi, which they believe is now in Rajashekhar's possession. The partners kidnap Sumathi and imprison and torture Rajashekhar and a final fight ensues where Shankar and Guru ( who are revealed to be twins) rescue and re-unite their parents.

Cast 

 Rajkumar as Rajashekhar alias Jayaraj/ Shankar/Gurumurthy alias Guru
 Jayamala as Nalini
 Padmapriya as Malathi
 Kanchana as Sumati
 Vaishali Kasaravalli in a cameo 
 Balakrishna as Advocate Lakshman Rao
 Vajramuni as Premkumar
 Thoogudeepa Srinivas as Madanlal
 Sampath as Gurumurthy
 Prabhakar as Tiger
 Uma Shivakumar as Doctor Prema
 Chandrashekhar as Divakar alias Duplicate Shankar
 Chi. Udayashankar
 Honnavalli Krishna
 Keerthi Raj

Soundtrack

The film music was composed by Upendra Kumar with lyrics for the soundtrack by Chi. Udaya Shankar. All the film's songs were sung by Rajkumar himself along with Vani Jayaram in Eneno Aase Nee Thanda and P. B. Sreenivas in Naa Benkiyanthe Naa Gaaliyanthe.

Reception 
Shankar Guru garnered positive responses from the audience as well as critics. The film was a phenomenal success in A, B and C centers. The film completed 100 days in all of the release centers. The film had a theatrical run of 58 consecutive weeks in Kempegowda theatere, Bangalore while it completed a 54 weeks theatrical run in several other centers. The film was a major commercial success at the box-office. The film was declared an industrial hit at the box office. The film had a theatrical run of about 365 days. It grossed 3.26 crores in its final run becoming the first Kannada film to gross over 3 crores at the box office. The film was the highest grossing Kannada film of the 70's.

Remakes 
It was remade in Tamil as Thirisoolam (1979), in Telugu as Kumara Raja (1978) and in Hindi as Mahaan (1983) in which, Rajkumar's characters were played by Sivaji Ganesan, Krishna and Amitabh Bachchan respectively. The Telugu version had the Kannada actress Jayanthi reprising Kanchana's role while Jayaprada reprised the role of Padmapriya.The names of all the characters including the henchmen were retained in the Tamil version.

Awards 
1977–78 Karnataka State Film Awards
 Best Editor – P. Bhaktavatsalam

Trivia 
 Chi. Udayashankar, the dialogue-writer for the film, titled the movie Shankar Guru after his sons Ravishankar and Chi. Guru Dutt.
 This was the first movie in which Prabhakar's character was called Tiger.
 This was actor Chandrashekhar's second film with Rajkumar after Raja Nanna Raja.
 During the making of the film, the director S. K. Bhagavan narrated a play called Lithuania by Rupert Brooke (titled The Return of the Soldier in Russian) to Rajkumar. The film was planned to be shot in Ladakh and some preparation was undertaken, but in the end Rajkumar backed out as he felt the story was too dark. 40 years later, the story was adapted into a film titled Aa Karaala Ratri (2018).

References

External links 
 

1978 films
1970s Kannada-language films
Kannada films remade in other languages
Films scored by Upendra Kumar
Films directed by V. Somashekhar
Indian action films
Twins in Indian films
Fictional portrayals of the Karnataka Police
1970s masala films
Films shot in Jammu and Kashmir
Films shot in Karnataka
1978 action films